Palus-Kadegaon Assembly constituency is one of the 288 Vidhan Sabha (legislative assembly) constituencies of Maharashtra state in western India.

Overview
Palus-Kadegaon constituency is one of the eight Vidhan Sabha constituencies located in the Sangli district.

Palus-Kadegaon is part of the Sangli Lok Sabha constituency along with five other Vidhan Sabha segments in this district, namely Miraj, Sangli, Khanapur, Tasgao-Kavathemahakal and Jat.

Members of Legislative Assembly
 1985: Patangrao Kadam, Independent
 1990: Patangrao Kadam, Indian National Congress
 1995: Sampatrao Deshmukh, Independent
 1996: Prithviraj Deshmukh, Independent
 1999: Patangrao Kadam, Indian National Congress
 2004: Patangrao Kadam, Indian National Congress
 2009: Patangrao Kadam, Indian National Congress
 2014: Patangrao Kadam, Indian National Congress
 2018: Vishwajeet Kadam, Indian National Congress  (Unopposed)
 2019: Vishwajeet Kadam, Indian National Congress

Election results

Assembly Elections 2009

Assembly Elections 2014

Assembly Elections 2019

See also
 Palus, Maharashtra
 List of constituencies of the Maharashtra Legislative Assembly

References

Assembly constituencies of Maharashtra
Sangli district